In differential geometry, the radius of curvature (Rc), is the reciprocal of the curvature. For a curve, it equals the radius of the circular arc which best approximates the curve at that point. For surfaces, the radius of curvature is the radius of a circle that best fits a normal section or combinations thereof.

Definition
In the case of a space curve, the radius of curvature is the length of the curvature vector.

In the case of a plane curve, then  is the absolute value of

 

Formula

In 2D

  
Also in Classical mechanics branch of Physics Radius of curvature is given by (Net Velocity)²/Acceleration  Perpendicular

Heuristically, this result can be interpreted as

In n dimensions
If  is a parametrized curve in  then the radius of curvature at each point of the curve, is given by

.

Derivation

Let  be as above, and fix . Clearly the radius will not depend on the position , only on the velocity  and acceleration .

The relevant derivatives of  work out to be

or, omitting the parameter  for readability,

Examples

Semicircles and circles

For a semi-circle of radius  in the upper half-plane

For a semi-circle of radius  in the lower half-plane

Ellipses

In an ellipse with major axis  and minor axis , the vertices on the major axis have the smallest radius of curvature of any points, ; and the vertices on the minor axis have the largest radius of curvature of any points, .  

The ellipse's radius of curvature, as a function of parameter t 

And as a function of θ

Applications
For the use in differential geometry, see Cesàro equation.
For the radius of curvature of the earth (approximated by an oblate ellipsoid); see also: arc measurement
Radius of curvature is also used in a three part equation for bending of beams.
Radius of curvature (optics)
Thin films technologies
Printed electronics
Minimum railway curve radius
AFM probe

Stress in semiconductor structures
Stress in the semiconductor structure involving evaporated thin films usually results from the thermal expansion (thermal stress) during the manufacturing process.  Thermal stress occurs because film depositions are usually made above room temperature. Upon cooling from the deposition temperature to room temperature, the difference in the thermal expansion coefficients of the substrate and the film cause thermal stress.

Intrinsic stress results from the microstructure created in the film as atoms are deposited on the substrate. Tensile stress results from microvoids (small holes, considered to be defects) in the thin film, because of the attractive interaction of atoms across the voids.

The stress in thin film semiconductor structures results in the buckling of the wafers. The radius of the curvature of the stressed structure is related to stress tensor in the structure, and can be described by modified Stoney formula. The topography of the stressed structure including radii of curvature can be measured using optical scanner methods. The modern scanner tools have capability to measure full topography of the substrate and to measure both principal radii of curvature, while providing the accuracy of the order of 0.1% for radii of curvature of 90 meters and more.

See also

Base curve radius
Bend radius
Degree of curvature (civil engineering)
Osculating circle
Track transition curve

References

Further reading

External links
 The Geometry Center: Principal Curvatures
 15.3 Curvature and Radius of Curvature
 
 

Differential geometry
Curvature (mathematics)
Curves
Integral calculus
Multivariable calculus
Theoretical physics